Floria Pinkney (1903 – after May 1984) was a Progressive Era garment worker and union activist from Brooklyn, New York. She was the first African-American woman to hold a leadership role as an organizer within the International Ladies Garment Workers Union.

Early life and education 
Pinkney was born in Connecticut. Her parents were both originally from Florida. After Pinkney's birth, her then widowed mother moved to Brooklyn where she became a self-employed dressmaker. Before working in the garment industry, Pinkney attended Manhattan Trade School. In 1925 Pinkney received a scholarship to Brookwood Labor College sponsored by the American Fund for Public Service (AFPS), which supported radical political causes. Her scholarship at Brockwood was extended two years due to her academic success, and Pinkney was recognized as a class speaker at graduation. Upon graduating, Pinkney become the first Black female to graduate from Brookwood Labor College. In 1930, Pinkney won an award from the New York School of Social Work to do a 6 month Fellowship at the University of Copenhagen. This fellowship focused on work that was being done in Denmark in adult education and social organization.

In 1984, Pinkney attended a reunion of the Bryn Mawr Summer School for Women Workers. She had been one of the first five Black students admitted to the school.

Activism 
Pinkney joined the International Ladies' Garment Workers' Union (ILGWU) in the 1920s and was quickly identified as a promising leader. She worked for several years before attending Brockwood Labor College. After graduating, she returned to the industry but was quickly appointed as a union organizer in 1929. Pinkney was instrumental in the IGLWU's September 1929 drive to enroll black garment workers. She spoke alongside A. Philip Randolph, who lead the Brotherhood of Sleeping Car Porters and ILGWU Vice President Julius Hochman at St. Luke's in Harlem. Randolph endorsed Pinkney as an organizer for the ILGWU, calling her "a capable young woman". She worked beyond the garment district and was active in both the Harlem and Brooklyn communities. 

Pinkney was on the board of managers for the Ashland Place YWCA in Brooklyn, and represented the Ashland Place Y at a regional conference in Trenton in 1926. She attended the 1930 YWCA national convention, where she was selected to represent the Industrial Assembly in Geneva, Switzerland. In 1933, she was barred from the Cairo Hotel in Washington, D.C., and other delegates to the same labor conference marched in protest. In 1935, she was appointed to teach worker education classes at the Harlem YWCA and Utopia Neighborhood House.

References 

Created via preloaddraft
African-American trade unionists
African-American women in politics
American women trade unionists
1903 births
Year of death missing
Place of death missing
International Ladies Garment Workers Union leaders
Trade unionists from New York (state)
People from Brooklyn
Brookwood Labor College alumni
20th-century African-American people
20th-century African-American women